Sydenham was a New Zealand parliamentary electorate, from 1881 to 1890 and again from 1946 to 1996. It had notable politicians representing it like Mabel Howard (the first female cabinet minister in New Zealand), Norman Kirk (who became Prime Minister while holding Sydenham) and Jim Anderton (a former  Father of the House, who started his parliamentary career in Sydenham).

Population centres
The previous electoral redistribution was undertaken in 1875 for the 1875–1876 election. In the six years since, New Zealand's European population had increased by 65%. In the 1881 electoral redistribution, the House of Representatives increased the number of European representatives to 91 (up from 84 since the 1875–76 election). The number of Māori electorates was held at four. The House further decided that electorates should not have more than one representative, which led to 35 new electorates being formed, including Sydenham, and two electorates that had previously been abolished to be recreated. This necessitated a major disruption to existing boundaries.

The 1941 New Zealand census had been postponed due to World War II, so the 1946 electoral redistribution had to take ten years of population growth and movements into account. The North Island gained a further two electorates from the South Island due to faster population growth. The abolition of the country quota through the Electoral Amendment Act, 1945 reduced the number and increased the size of rural electorates. None of the existing electorates remained unchanged, 27 electorates were abolished, 19 electorates were created for the first time, and eight former electorates were re-established, including Sydenham.

This suburban electorate is in the southern suburbs of Christchurch including Sydenham.

History
The electorate existed from 1881 to 1890 and then from the 1946 election to the 1996 election, the first mixed-member proportional (MMP) election.

The first MP for Sydenham was William White from 1881 to 1886. He resigned upon receiving medical advice.

From 1886 to 1890, it was represented by Richard Molesworth Taylor.

From 1946 to 1996, the electorate was always left leaning. In 1946, Mabel Howard was elected. She held the electorate until 1969, when the Labour Party introduced rules that forced her to retire. In 1947 she became New Zealand's first woman cabinet minister when she was made Minister of Health and Minister in charge of Child Welfare. She is remembered for waving two large pairs of bloomers in parliament in support of her successful campaign to have clothing sizes standardised.

Howard was succeeded by Norman Kirk, who in 1969 shifted from the Lyttelton electorate to the safer Labour electorate of Sydenham. During his representation of Sydenham, he became Prime Minister. He died in office on 31 August 1974.

John Kirk succeeded his father in a 1974 by-election. Kirk Jr. held the electorate for ten years until 1984. In his place Labour selected Jim Anderton, the party president, whereupon Kirk (a strong David Lange supporter) declared that he would stand against the official Labour candidate as an independent. His continuing opposition to Anderton's selection resulted in the Labour Party's New Zealand Council suspending him from membership of the Labour Party. Kirk served out the remainder of his parliamentary career as an Independent MP. John Kirk left New Zealand in 1984 while still an MP for Sydenham, as he owed more than $280,000. He was arrested in the US and imprisoned, and then extradited to New Zealand, where he was charged under the Insolvency Act 1985. He was sentenced to four months' periodic detention.

Anderton was successful in Sydenham in 1969 and started his long parliamentary career. While holding Sydenham, Anderton defected from the Labour Party to found the NewLabour Party in 1989, and was re-elected in the electorate in 1990. In 1991, NewLabour and several other parties formed the Alliance, a broad left-wing coalition. Anderton was elected for the Alliance in 1993.

Sydenham was abolished in 1996 and replaced by the Wigram electorate.

Members of Parliament

Key

1 John Kirk became an independent in 1983.
2 Jim Anderton defected to New Labour in 1989, and co-founded the Alliance in 1991.

Election results

1993 election

1990 election

1987 election

1984 election

1981 election

1978 election

1975 election

1974 by-election

1972 election

1969 election

1966 election

1963 election

1960 election

1957 election

1954 election

1951 election

1949 election

1946 election

1887 election

1886 by-election

1884 election

1881 election

Notes

References

1881 establishments in New Zealand
1996 disestablishments in New Zealand
Historical electorates of New Zealand
Politics of Christchurch
History of Christchurch
1946 establishments in New Zealand
1887 disestablishments in New Zealand